Margaret Woodlock (born 20 May 1938) is an Australian athlete. She competed in the women's shot put at the 1956 Summer Olympics.

References

1938 births
Living people
Athletes (track and field) at the 1956 Summer Olympics
Australian female shot putters
Olympic athletes of Australia
Place of birth missing (living people)